WLU may refer to:

Universities 
Washington and Lee University, in Lexington, Virginia, United States
West Liberty University, in West Liberty, West Virginia, United States
Wilfrid Laurier University, in Waterloo, Ontario, Canada

Other uses 
 Western Labor Union, a defunct trade union of the United States
 Wuliwuli language, an extinct language of Australia